Vafs may refer to:
 Vafs, Hamadan
 Vafs, Markazi